Stéphanie Douard (born 10 March 1979) is a former French Paralympic swimmer who competed in international level events. She has won five bronze medals in the World Para Swimming Championships and World Para Swimming European Championships. She has represented France at the 2012 Summer Paralympics but did not medal in her events. 
Jordi Reina was his coach

References

External links
 
 

1979 births
Living people
Sportspeople from Bourg-en-Bresse
Paralympic swimmers of France
Swimmers at the 2012 Summer Paralympics
Medalists at the World Para Swimming Championships
Medalists at the World Para Swimming European Championships
S11-classified Paralympic swimmers